Mirowice may refer to the following places:
Mirowice, Kuyavian-Pomeranian Voivodeship (north-central Poland)
Mirowice, Masovian Voivodeship (east-central Poland)
Mirowice, Pomeranian Voivodeship (north Poland)